Louis Jacob Breithaupt (3March 18556March 1939) was an Ontario manufacturer and politician. He represented Waterloo North in the Legislative Assembly of Ontario from 1899 to 1902 as a Liberal member.

Biography

Louis Jacob Breithaupt was born on 3 March 1855 in Buffalo, New York, the son of Catharine Hailer and Philip Ludwig "Louis" Breithaupt. Louis Jacob moved to Berlin, Ontario (later renamed Kitchener) with his family in 1857 and was mayor of Berlin himself from 1888 to 1889. In 1881, he married Emma Alvarene Devitt, the daughter of Benjamin Devitt, then mayor of Waterloo, Ontario. Breithaupt was manager of the Breithaupt Leather Company, president of the Berlin Gas Company and was also associated with other manufacturing businesses. He served as president of the Board of Trade in 1891.

His brother John Christian was mayor of Berlin in 1896 to 1897 and his brother Ezra Carl also served on the Berlin Board of Trade. His son Louis Orville later served as mayor of the city of Kitchener, a member of the House of Commons and Lieutenant-Governor for Ontario. His daughter Rosa Melvina (Breithaupt) Hewetson is the great-grandmother of Canadian actors Stephen Amell and Robbie Amell.

While wintering in Florida, Breithaupt died on 6 March 1939 at the age of 84 after contracting bronchial pneumonia following a fall and fractured arm. His gravestone is at Mount Hope Cemetery in Kitchener.

References

External links 
 Kitchener Mount Hope Cemetery (pdf)
Member's parliamentary history for the Legislative Assembly of Ontario
The Canadian album : Men of Canada; or, Success by example ..., W Cochrane (1891)

1855 births
1939 deaths
Mayors of Kitchener, Ontario
Ontario Liberal Party MPPs
Canadian people of German descent
Burials at Mount Hope Cemetery, Kitchener, Ontario